Michael Vincent DiGregorio (born December 12, 1991) is a Filipino-Italian professional basketball player for the Blackwater Bossing of the Philippine Basketball Association (PBA). He was drafted 35th overall by the Mahindra Enforcer in the 2015 PBA draft.

Professional career
DiGregorio was drafted 35th overall by the Mahindra Enforcer during the fourth round of the 2015 PBA draft.

On February 20, 2017, DiGregorio was signed by the Blackwater Elite. DiGregorio's play in the 2017 Commissioners Cup and 2017 Governors' Cup thrust him into being one of the finalists for the 2017 PBA Most Improved Player award at the annual PBA Leo Awards Night. On September 7, 2017, he signed a two-year contract extension with the team.

On October 19, 2019, he was traded to the TNT KaTropa for Brian Heruela.

On January 6, 2020, DiGregorio, along with a 2023 second-round draft pick, was traded to the Alaska Aces for Simon Enciso.

On May 12, 2022, DiGregorio signed a two-year deal with the Converge FiberXers, the new team that took over the defunct Alaska Aces franchise.

On January 3, 2023, DiGregorio, along with Tyrus Hill and RK Ilagan, was traded to the Blackwater Bossing for Barkley Eboña and a 2022 first-round pick. This is his second stint with the franchise.

PBA career statistics

As of the end of 2022–23 season

Season-by-season averages
 
|-
| align=left | 
| align=left | Mahindra
| 28 || 17.8 || .377 || .346 || .812 || 1.4 || .9 || .1 || .1 || 6.2
|-
| align=left rowspan=2| 
| align=left | Mahindra
| rowspan=2|31 || rowspan=2|25.8 || rowspan=2|.400 || rowspan=2|.425 || rowspan=2|.800 || rowspan=2|1.9 || rowspan=2|1.5 || rowspan=2|.5 || rowspan=2|.0 || rowspan=2|11.3
|-
| align=left | Blackwater
|-
| align=left | 
| align=left | Blackwater
| 34 || 29.3 || .392 || .398 || .855 || 2.7 || 2.0 || .8 || .1 || 12.4
|-
| align=left rowspan=2| 
| align=left | Blackwater
| rowspan=2|40 || rowspan=2|22.4 || rowspan=2|.399 || rowspan=2|.395 || rowspan=2|.831 || rowspan=2|2.4 || rowspan=2|1.4 || rowspan=2|.5 || rowspan=2|.0 || rowspan=2|9.8
|-
| align=left | TNT
|-
| align=left | 
| align=left | Alaska
| 12 || 24.8 || .411 || .333 || .879 || 3.0 || 1.3 || .3 || .0 || 10.8
|-
| align="left" | 
| align=left | Alaska
| 24 || 23.9 || .335 || .340 || .758 || 2.3 || 1.8  || .3 || .0 || 9.3
|-
| align=left rowspan=2| 
| align=left | Converge
| rowspan=2|30 || rowspan=2|12.8 || rowspan=2|.352 || rowspan=2|.231 || rowspan=2|.795 || rowspan=2|1.1 || rowspan=2|.6 || rowspan=2|.2 || rowspan=2|.0 || rowspan=2|4.9
|-
| align=left | Blackwater
|-class=sortbottom
| colspan="2" align="center" | Career
| 199 || 22.3 || .385 || .372 || .818 || 2.1 || 1.4 || .4 || .0 || 9.2

Personal life 
He is a nephew of former NBA player Ernie DiGregorio.

References 

1991 births
Living people
Alaska Aces (PBA) players
American men's basketball players
American sportspeople of Filipino descent
Basketball players from Chicago
Blackwater Bossing players
Converge FiberXers players
Filipino men's basketball players
Filipino people of Italian descent
Point guards
Shooting guards
Terrafirma Dyip draft picks
Terrafirma Dyip players
TNT Tropang Giga players